Shina Novalinga (Inuktitut syllabics: ᓯ̵ᓇ ᓄᕙᓕᓐᒐ, born 1998) is an Inuk social media personality, singer, and activist. She gained fame for posting videos throat singing with her mother on TikTok and Instagram. As of August 2022, she has over 4 million TikTok followers and 2 million Instagram followers.

Early life and education
Shina Novalinga was born in 1998 to her mother Caroline (Kayuula) Novalinga, a professional throat singer, in Puvirnituq, Nunavik, Canada and moved to Montreal when she was four years old. She describes herself as half Inuk and half Quebecoise. Novalinga learned to speak Inuktitut with her mother, and began throat singing under her mother's instruction when she was seven. She has a younger sister named Catherine Lizotte. 

In the spring of 2021, Novalinga graduated with a degree in business management from John Abbott College in Quebec. She started a one-year program in Inuit Studies at Nunavik Sivunitsavut in Montreal in fall 2021.

Social media
Novalinga gained fame in March 2020 after she began posting viral videos to TikTok under the handle @shinanova which feature aspects of her Inuit culture. As of July 2021, Novalinga's most viewed video portrays her mother brushing and braiding Novalinga's hair to the song "Savage Daughter" by Sarah Hester Ross, with 21.6 million views.

Throat singing
Inuit throat singing is a cultural practice that became increasingly rare after Christian missionaries outlawed the songs as "Satanic" in the early 20th century. In Puvirnituq, Novalinga's mother Carolina Novalinga was one of four Inuit women who were taught the practice to pass on to younger generations.

Novalinga first posted herself throat singing in her first video posted to TikTok in March 2020, and has posted dozens of such videos since. Novalinga's throat singing videos feature her facing her mother Carolina in an embrace, singing in a matched rhythm using their throat, belly and diaphragm. They often end in the two breaking song and laughing. Novalinga has been vocal about the importance of throat singing both for her relationship with her mother and Inuit culture as a whole:

In June 2021, Novalinga released an album with her mother and Canadian producer Simon Walls, Mother and Daughter Throatsinging.

Fashion
Novalinga also uses her platform to model traditional Inuit clothing. In 2021, Novalinga modeled for a Sephora ad campaign featuring all-indigenous cast and crew in celebration of Canada's National Indigenous History Month. In 2022, she was featured in Elle Canada modelling designs by Inuk designer Victoria Kakuktinniq.

Indigenous activism

Novalinga has been outspoken about her desire to educate others about Inuit culture and history. She frequently adds "indigenous twists" to trends on TikTok as a way of sharing her culture, and has collaborated with Cree creators including hoop dancer James Jones and model Michelle Chubb. Novalinga has also created videos drawing attention to the oppressive history of assimilationist residential schools and to missing and murdered indigenous women. In summer 2021 she posted multiple videos reacting to the 2021 Canadian Indian residential schools gravesite discoveries.

Novalinga has used her platform to raise support for various charity causes as well, raising over $12,000 for an indigenous women's shelter in Quebec in December 2020.

Discography

References

External links
 
 

1998 births
People from Nunavik
Inuit from Quebec
Inuit musicians
Inuit throat singing
Inuit activists
Canadian Inuit women
Canadian TikTokers
Living people
Canadian women activists
21st-century Canadian women singers
Singers from Quebec
Activists from Quebec